Exergen Corporation is a designer and manufacturer of infrared scanners, thermometers, and sensors headquartered in Watertown, Massachusetts.  Exergen's products are used in application in medical, automotive, food processing, agriculture and textile.  The company was founded by Francesco Pompei in 1980.

Products
Exergen's products include:

Thermometers
1985 - D-Series - Emissivity error-free infrared thermometer.
1988 - Ototemp - Scanning tympanic medical thermometer.
1990 - Ototemp Veterinary - Tympanic thermometer for animals.
1991 - Ear thermometer employing arterial heat balance.
1996 - Infrared axillary thermometer.
1997 - Consumer infrared axillary thermometer.
1999 - Temporal artery thermometers for professionals and consumers.
2000 - Palm-sized emissivity error-free infrared thermometer.

Scanners
1983 - Microscanner - Pocket-sized infrared temperature scanner.
1987 - E-Series - Infrared scanner designed exclusively for electrical inspection.
1987 - Dermatemp - Infrared scanner for emissivity error-free skin temperature assessment.
1989 - Equine Scanner - Scanner for injury assessment of equine athletes.

Sensors

1991 - IRt/c - Unpowered IR thermocouple
2002 - Microprocessor-based linearized, infrared temperature sensor.
2004 - 20:1 field of view microprocessor-based linearized, infrared temperature sensor.

Thermocouples
2003 - Micro-sized, unpowered IR thermocouple.
2004 - 4:1 field of view, unpowered IR thermocouple.

Other products
1980 - Exergram - Quantitative heat loss camera system for energy conservation.
1995 - Thermal switch to detect presence of hot melt adhesive and hot objects.

References

External links 

Electronics companies of the United States
Manufacturing companies based in Massachusetts
Companies based in Watertown, Massachusetts
Electronics companies established in 1980
American companies established in 1980
1980 establishments in Massachusetts
Sensor manufacturers
Instrument-making corporations